Tongbaite is a rare mineral that has the chemical formula Cr3C2, or chromium carbide.

It was first described in 1983 for an occurrence in Liu village, Tongbai County (桐柏县), Henan Province, China and named for the locality. It occurs in an ultramafic rock deposit.  It has also been found in the Tibet Autonomous Region and the Isovsky District, in the Urals of Russia.

References

Carbide minerals
Chromium minerals
Orthorhombic minerals
Minerals in space group 62